The 1998–99 English Hockey League season took place from October 1998 until May 1999.

The men's National League was won by Cannock with the women's National League going to Slough. The top four clubs entered the newly introduced Premiership play off tournament which culminated with men's & women's finals on 3 May. Cannock won the men's Premiership tournament and Slough claimed the women's Premiership tournament.

The Men's Hockey Association Cup was won by Reading and the Women's Cup (AEWHA Cup) was won by Slough.

Men's National League Premier Division League Standings

Women's National League Premier Division League Standings

Men's Premiership Tournament

Women's Premiership Tournament

Men's Cup (Hockey Association Cup)

Quarter-finals

Semi-finals

Final 
(Held at the National Hockey Stadium (Milton Keynes) on 9 May)

Women's Cup (AEWHA Cup)

Quarter-finals

Semi-finals

Final 
(Held at National Hockey Stadium (Milton Keynes) on 16 May)

Slough
L Smith, Alison Burd, Sue Chandler (capt), Ashleigh Wallace, Julie Robertson, Karen Brown, Fiona Greenham, Sarah Kelleher, Jane Smith, Mandy Nicholson, Anna Bennett subs Lesley Hobley, Monique Slootmaekers, L Williams
Leicester
A Claxton, S Naylor, Emma Newbold, Joanne Mould, Tina Dullaghan, Carol Voss, Helen Richardson, Kirsty Bowden, Sarah Blanks, Lucy Beavon, Purdy Miller subs V Knott

References 

1998
field hockey
field hockey
1998 in field hockey
1999 in field hockey